The Summerland disaster occurred when a fire spread through the Summerland leisure centre in Douglas on the Isle of Man on the night of 2 August 1973. Fifty people were killed and 80 seriously injured. The scale of the fire has been compared to those seen during the Blitz.

Background
Summerland was opened on 25 May 1971. The building's exterior and the interior were designed by two different architects—they did not coordinate their planning with each other and thereby created a venue with significant fire risks that were to become apparent only later.

Summerland was designed to accommodate up to 10,000 tourists and consisted of a dance hall, five floors of holiday games, a rollerskating rink, restaurants and public bars. It was an example of Modernist architecture incorporating advanced controlled internal climate, built with novel construction techniques using new plastic materials. The street frontage and part of the roof was clad in Oroglas, a transparent acrylic glass sheeting.

Fire
The fire started at around 7:30 p.m. on 2 August 1973 when approximately 3,000 people were inside, and was caused by three boys who were smoking in a small disused kiosk, on the centre's miniature golf course and who told police it was likely started by a carelessly discarded match or stub. The burning kiosk collapsed against the exterior of the building. This part of the building was clad in a material called Galbestos: profiled steel sheeting with asbestos felt on both sides coated with bitumen, with no fire-resistant qualities. The fire spread to the wall's interior soundproofing material, which was highly combustible, causing an intense fire that ignited the flammable acrylic sheeting that covered the rest of the building. The fire quickly spread across the sheeting on the leisure centre walls and roof, and through vents which were not properly fireproofed. The acrylic material melted, allowing more oxygen to enter, and dropping burning molten material, both starting other fires and injuring those trying to escape. The building's open-plan design included many unblocked internal spaces that acted as chimneys, adding to the conflagration.

There was no attempt to evacuate the 3,000 people present until the visible evidence of the flames prompted a panic-stricken mass rush for the exits. The fire was contained in an internal space within the walls until it penetrated the interior, destroying the wiring of the fire alarm system in the process. One survivor (who was a child at the time) remembered her father noticing smoke coming from the ventilation shaft and had started to attempt to evacuate when the whole area erupted in flames. The survivor and her mother were separated from her father and sister and stuck in the venue before being rescued through a window by firemen.

Because of the locked fire doors, many people headed to the main entrance, which caused a crush.

The fire services were not called for over 20 minutes, and even then the call did not originate from Summerland. The coastguard immediately called the fire brigade. The first responding fire crews realised additional resources would be required and almost every resource available to the Isle of Man Fire and Rescue Service was mobilised to the incident (93 of its 106 firefighters and all 16 of its engines).

Victims 
The fire killed 50 people, eleven of them under the age of twenty.  Around 80 people were seriously injured in the resulting crush and fire and received physical and mental scars. The fire brigade's provisional total of 51 deaths at the scene was subsequently revised down to 48, and two others died in hospital, one in Douglas on 11 August and the other in Scotland on 29 September; the latter is excluded from the Isle of Man coroner's list of 49 deaths. Ian Phillips of Birmingham University suggests these reporting discrepancies explain why some sources have given incorrect death tolls of 49, 51, or 53. The inscription on the 1998 disaster memorial did not give a death toll; its 2013 replacement lists all 50 names.

Aftermath
The death toll brought about a public inquiry that ran from September 1973 to February 1974. Denis Cowley QC acted for the Douglas Corporation. No specific individuals or groups were blamed and the deaths were attributed to misadventure, although the delay in evacuation and the flammable building materials were condemned. On 17 September 1973, three Liverpool boys – two of them 12 and the other 14 – appeared before Douglas Juvenile Court and admitted wilfully and unlawfully damaging the lock of a plastic kiosk next to Summerland. They were each fined £3 (equal to £31.86 in 2020) and ordered to pay 33p compensation and 15p costs. Changes to building regulations to improve fire safety were introduced. The centre was seriously damaged by the fire. Its charred steel skeletal remains were demolished in 1975 and then rebuilt on a smaller scale, construction commencing in 1976, with a smaller area of glass than the original, and a highly advanced fire extinguisher and alarm system. The centre reopened in June 1978.

Soon after the disaster, John Hinnigan was brought in from Blackburn fire and rescue to become the new chief.

2002 flood and final closure

In October 2002, torrential rain caused damage to several structures, as well as two landslides behind Summerland which dislodged two 50-tonne concrete blocks that had once supported the roof of the original building, but had not been removed in the wake of the fire. After a geotechnical team determined that the blocks could not be safely stabilised or removed, and that there was a risk they would fall into the buildings below, the site was scheduled for demolition. With the building also suffering from concrete cancer, the remainder of the site closed in 2004, and demolition began in January 2006. The west wall remains intact as there is concern that its removal may cause the adjacent cliff to collapse.

Memorials

Forty years after the tragedy, a permanent memorial in the form of three granite columns was unveiled at Kaye Memorial Gardens, at the bottom of Summer Hill. It bears the names of those killed in the fire and is set into a circle of paving, alongside a stone laid earlier to mark the 25th anniversary.

On other anniversaries of the disaster many memorials take place, such as a memorial concert and a moment of silence at the location which is now a vacant site.

Depiction in media 
One survivor wrote about her experiences from the fire in a book entitled Made in Summerland, which was published in July 2018.

See also
Stardust fire, 1981

References

External links
 "Fireproof' funland toll close to 50"—Montreal Gazette, 4 August 1973
 On this day—Memorial, BBC
 University of Birmingham, Ian Phillips in "Research" section book From 21st century leisure to 20th century holiday catastrophe: the Isle of Man Summerland fire disaster
 1972 amateur film of pre-disaster Summerland - Rick Newbry, Chris Mannion, Youtube

1973 fires in Europe
1973 in the Isle of Man
Building and structure fires
Fire disasters involving barricaded escape routes
Fires in the Isle of Man
Nightclub fires
August 1973 events
1973 disasters in Europe